The Lost Warrior may refer to:

 The Lost Warrior (comics), an original English-language manga trilogy based on the best-selling book series Warriors by Erin Hunter
 "The Lost Warrior", a season 1 episode of the 1978 Battlestar Galactica series